Mohd Alafi bin Mahmud (born 29 April 1985) is a Malaysian professional footballer who plays for Malaysia M3 League side Imigresen.

Career statistics

Club

Honours

Club
PDRM
Malaysia Premier League: 2014

References

External links

1985 births
Living people
Malaysian footballers
Sri Pahang FC players
Perlis FA players
Penang F.C. players
Negeri Sembilan FA players

Association football forwards